Vanderhoof (District) Water Aerodrome, formerly , was located adjacent to Vanderhoof, British Columbia, Canada.

See also
Vanderhoof Airport

References

Defunct seaplane bases in British Columbia
Regional District of Bulkley-Nechako
Registered aerodromes in British Columbia